Wirral Urban District was an urban district in Cheshire, England from 1933 to 1974. It was created from part of the disbanded Wirral Rural District and  covered an area in the south-west of the Wirral Peninsula. The civil parishes of Barnston, Gayton, Heswall cum Oldfield, Irby, Pensby, and Thurstaston were entirely within its boundaries. Additionally, the district encompassed parts of Arrowe, Brimstage and Thornton Hough civil parishes.

On 1 April 1974, under the Local Government Act 1972, it was abolished and its area absorbed into the Metropolitan Borough of Wirral of the metropolitan county of Merseyside.

References

Former districts of Cheshire
History of Merseyside
Districts of England abolished by the Local Government Act 1972
Local government in the Metropolitan Borough of Wirral
Urban districts of England
Unparished areas in Merseyside